Ningbo University (NBU) is located in Jiangbei District, Ningbo, Zhejiang, China. It is a provincially governed key university in Zhejiang Province. It is a Chinese state Double First Class University Plan university, identified by the Ministry of Education.

History
Ningbo University was established in 1986 by the donation of Yue-Kong Pao. Other major benefactors include Sir Run-run Shaw, Sir Chao An Chung, Sir Hans Tang, Sir Yue-shu Pao, Sir Cao Guangbiao, Sir Li Dashan, Sir Zhu Yinglong.

In 1996, Ningbo Normal College and Zhejiang Shuichan College, Ningbo were merged into Ningbo University.

In the early years of the school founding, Zhejiang University, Fudan University, China University of Science and Technology, Beijing University and other counterparts reconstruction, starting point to begin the school history.

After 2000, Ningbo Maritime School, Ningbo Forestry School, and Ningbo Normal School were merged into Ningbo University.

The first president was Zhu Zhaoxiang, serving from September 1985 to September 1988. Academician Yan Luguang served as president from 1999 to 2004.

School Ranking
The school ranking by the Wushu Lian presided over the "2015 China University Evaluation", the 2015 Chinese University Ranking Award comprehensive strength ranked 76 (40.4 points) out of TOP 192 China Universities.
Faculty of Education ranked 26 in china
Faculty of Science and Technology ranked 96
Faculty of Engineering ranked 87
Faculty of Science ranked 91 
Faculty of Economics ranked 59  
Faculty of Law ranked 55
Faculty of literature ranked 46 
2011 University research ranking of top 70 in East of China ranked 27 
2011 East China University Research ranked 35
In 2018-2019 Ningbo University was ranked 102 on the national level

Schools
Business School of Ningbo University
School of Marine Science
School of Information Science and Engineering
School of Science
School of Medicine
School of Mechanical Engineering and Mechanics
School of Law
School of Teacher Education
School of Maritime and Transportation
School of Sport Science
Medical School
School of Arts
School of Architecture, Civil Engineering

References

External links

 
 Official website
https://www.nbu.edu.cn/en/

 
Education in Ningbo
Educational institutions established in 1986
Universities and colleges in Zhejiang
Universities in China with English-medium medical schools
1986 establishments in China